The 1930 Buffalo Bisons football team was an American football team that represented the University at Buffalo as an independent during the 1930 college football season. In its second and final season under head coach Jay L. Lee, the team compiled a 3–5 record. The team played its home games at Rotary Field in Buffalo, New York.

Schedule

References

Bufflao
Buffalo Bulls football seasons
Buffalo Bulls football